New Musik were an English synthpop group active from 1977 to 1982. Led by Tony Mansfield, they achieved success in 1980 with the top 20 single "Living by Numbers" which was followed up with the top 40 hits "This World of Water", "Sanctuary" and hit album From A to B.

History
New Musik formed in 1977 in London, growing out of a casual band of South London school friends who jammed together under the name End of the World. The lead vocalist and frontman for the band was songwriter and record producer Tony Mansfield, who was also a former member of the Nick Straker Band, and was joined in the original line-up by Straker, bassist Tony Hibbert and drummer Phil Towner.

Their first single, "Straight Lines", was released by GTO Records in 1979, and their debut album, From A to B, came out in April 1980. Straker left the band to pursue a solo career and was replaced by Clive Gates for the album.

New Musik made their first appearance on the BBC TV pop programme Top of the Pops in October 1979 with their debut "Straight Lines", which received airplay on BBC Radio 1 from guest DJ Frank Zappa, and also on WPIX-FM in New York. From A to B reached the Top 40 in the UK Albums Chart, and contained four hit singles: "Straight Lines", "This World of Water", "Sanctuary" and their most commercially successful single "Living by Numbers". In 1980, Casio used the latter track as part of a TV advertising campaign for its digital calculators, latching on to the phrase "Such a digital lifetime" used in one of the verses.

Touring the UK in 1980, New Musik performed at May Balls in both Oxford and Cambridge with Elvis Costello; and the Rotterdam New Pop 1980 festival in the Netherlands. In 1981, the band played a second UK tour and were featured in a 1981 documentary film, Listen to London, performing "Straight Lines" and "This World of Water".

The band's second album, Anywhere, was released in 1981 and reached No. 68 in the UK. The album's single releases, "Luxury" and "While You Wait", did not chart. The band performed "Luxury" on Multi-Coloured Swap Shop. In 1981, a compilation album, Sanctuary, was released exclusively in the United States, consisting of five tracks from From A to B and seven from Anywhere. Previous to this release, there had also been a four-song 10" vinyl "Straight Lines" released by CBS Records in the U.S. as part of their short-lived Epic 'Nu-Disk' series, which also included The Clash's, Black Market Clash. Towner and Hibbert departed, and Mansfield and Gates cut the next album with the assistance of studio musicians.

After the demise of GTO Records, the band released their third and final album, Warp, in 1982 which was more experimental than their previous releases. Warp was almost entirely electronic, and one of the first albums to be recorded primarily with digital samplers and emulators. It featured a synthesized version of The Beatles' hit song "All You Need Is Love", alongside an identically titled track of their own. New Musik disbanded shortly after its  release that year.

Mansfield went on to achieve success in the field of production with After the Fire, a-ha, Aztec Camera, The B-52's, The Damned, Captain Sensible, Naked Eyes, Mari Wilson, Jean Paul Gaultier, Miguel Bosé, and Ana Torroja.

From A to B and Anywhere were released on CD in 1994, and again in 2001 and 2011, remastered and with bonus tracks. Warp was also released with bonus tracks on CD for the first time in 2001, exclusively in Japan. Warp's first CD release in the UK came in January 2011 on the Cherry Red label (CDLEMD 182).

Members

Last line up before disbandment
Tony Mansfield (1977–1982)
Clive Gates (c. 1979–1982)
Cliff Venner (1982)

Other members
Nick Straker (1977–1979)
Tony Hibbert (1977–81)
Phil Towner (1977–81)

Timeline

Discography

Studio albums

Compilation albums

Singles

See also
List of new wave artists and bands
List of synthpop artists
List of performers on Top of the Pops

References

External links
 Foremost New Musik fan site
 TopPop performance of "This World of Water" on YouTube

English synth-pop groups
British synth-pop new wave groups
English new wave musical groups
English electronic music groups
English pop music groups
Musical groups from London
Musical groups established in 1977
Musical groups disestablished in 1982